An opposing force (alternatively enemy force, abbreviated OPFOR) is a military unit tasked with representing an enemy, usually for training purposes in war game scenarios. The related concept of aggressor squadron is used by some air forces. The United States maintains the Fort Irwin National Training Center with the 11th Armored Cavalry Regiment serving in the OPFOR role. Fort Polk's Joint Readiness Training Center (JRTC) is another major training site typically reserved for light infantry units, and the OPFOR are the 1st of the 509th Airborne Infantry Regiment. The Army's Joint Maneuver Readiness Center (JMRC, at Hohenfels, Bavaria, Germany) has the 1st of the 4th Infantry Regiment as their OPFOR. Other major units include the First United States Army which consists of 16 training brigades that often also serve as OPFOR.

At a basic level, a unit might serve as an opposing force for a single scenario, differing from its 'opponents' only in the objectives it is given. However, major armies commonly maintain specialized groups trained to accurately replicate real-life enemies, to provide a more realistic experience for their training opponents. (To avoid the diplomatic ramifications of naming a real nation as a likely enemy, training scenarios often use fictionalized versions with different names but similar military characteristics to the expected real-world foes.)

Units

China

France 
Declassed AMX-30 tanks were used to simulate Soviet T-72s, until 2018.

Japan

United States 

There are three major training centers that utilize home-based OPFOR units for the US Army:

 The National Training Center or NTC at Fort Irwin, California—home unit is the 11th Armored Cavalry Regiment (the Blackhorse)
 The Joint Readiness Training Center or JRTC at Fort Polk, Louisiana—home unit is the 1st Battalion, 509th Parachute Infantry Regiment (the Geronimos)
 The Joint Multinational Readiness Center or JMRC (formerly known as the Combat Maneuver Training Center or CMTC) at Hohenfels, Germany—home unit is the 1st Battalion, 4th Infantry Regiment (Separate) (the Warriors)

Various US military installations or major units have their own local versions of opposing force used for training exercises. The joint Australian–US military exercise "Crocodile '03" featured an Australian-led opposing force in which soldiers from a range of Australian units worked together with a US Marine Corps contingent.

Several state defense forces have served as OPFOR units when training with the National Guard. The California State Military Reserve, the Georgia State Defense Force, and the New York Guard have provided OPFOR services to their respective National Guard counterparts. In 2018, the Georgia State Defense Force established the OPFOR Battalion to assist National Guard Soldiers with pre-deployment training.

Ranks 
Officer ranks

Other ranks
</noinclude>
</noinclude>

Gallery

Notes

References

Further reading 

 Validating the "Enemy" (discusses the United States Army OPFOR units and post-Cold War changes to OPFOR.)
 The Circle Trigonists (Aggressors), a summary of the opposing force Aggressor used by the United States Army from ca. 1946–1978

Military education and training